Lakeshore Mall is an enclosed shopping mall in Gainesville, Georgia. It was built in 1970 and features four anchor stores.

History
The center opened as Lakeshore Plaza in 1970, featuring Roses Stores and JCPenney. Belk-Gallant joined in 1973 as a third anchor. An expansion in 1987 added a new wing on the opposite side of JCPenney, which included a Sears, a food court, and a movie theater. Also, the Roses store became a second Belk. In 1998, the mall was sold to Colonial Properties, and again in 2010 to Garrison Investment Group.

In October 2013, Dick's Sporting Goods opened between Sears and JCPenney, in the space previously occupied by the food court, movie theater, and several small shop stores. The mall was purchased by Stockbridge Enterprises in 2017.

On December 28, 2018, it was announced that Sears would be closing as part of a plan to close 80 stores nationwide. The store will close in March 2019.

On June 4, 2020, it was announced that JCPenney will be closing around October 2020 as part of a plan to close 154 stores nationwide. After JCPenney closes, Dick's Sporting Goods, the 2 Belks, and Books-A-Million will be the only anchor stores left.

References

Shopping malls established in 1970
Shopping malls in Georgia (U.S. state)
Buildings and structures in Hall County, Georgia
1970 establishments in Georgia (U.S. state)